The Matabeleland mole-rat (Cryptomys nimrodi) is a species of mole-rat found in Zimbabwe.

References

Cryptomys
Bathyergidae
Mammals described in 1896
Taxa named by William Edward de Winton